Perico is a municipality and town in the Matanzas Province of Cuba. It is located south of Marti, north of Colón and east of Jovellanos.

Geography
The municipality is divided into the barrios of Altamisal, Norte, Quintana, Roque, Sur and Tinguaro.

It counts the hamlets (consejos populares) of España Republicana, meaning Republican Spain, and Máximo Gómez, named after the military commander in Cuban War of Independence.

History
Perico was founded in 1874 near a garrison of the Spanish Colonial Civil Guard. The name was changed in 1885 to Miguel de Cervantes, then restored to Perico in 1899.

Demographics
In 2004, the municipality of Perico had a population of 31,147.

Transport
Perico is crossed by the Carretera Central highway and counts a railway station of the main line from Havana to Santiago de Cuba.

Notable people
Félix Navarro Rodríguez, dissident He was later released.
Minnie Miñoso, famed American League baseball player.
Blanca Rosa Gil (1937-), famous Cuban bolero singer.

See also
Municipalities of Cuba
List of cities in Cuba

References

External links

Populated places in Matanzas Province